B.I.B.L.E. (a backronym for Basic Instructions Before Leaving Earth) is the debut studio album by American rapper Fivio Foreign. It was released on April 8, 2022, through Columbia Records and RichFish. The production on the album was handled by multiple producers including Kanye West, Mike Dean, the Chainsmokers and Dem Jointz among others. It also features guest appearances from Quavo, Alicia Keys, Queen Naija, Chloe, ASAP Rocky, Lil Tjay, Polo G, Ne-Yo, and the Kid Laroi, among others. Fivio Foreign  The album is supported by two singles. The lead single, "City of Gods", peaked at number 46 on the US Billboard Hot 100. It was followed by "Magic City", which did not chart. The album received generally positive reviews from music critics and moderate commercial success. A third single, "What's My Name", was added. The album debuted at number nine on the US Billboard 200 chart, earning 29,000 album-equivalent units in its first week. A fourth single, "Paris to Tokyo", a collaboration with the Kid Laroi, was released after the album had already released, and was soon added to the album afterwards.

Critical reception

B.I.B.L.E. was met with generally positive reviews from music critics. At Metacritic, which assigns a normalized rating out of 100 to reviews from mainstream music critics, the album received an average score of 68, based on 4 reviews, which indicates "generally favourable reviews." Writing for Clash, Ath'e Zihle felt that "although I would not say that this album breaks boundaries or sparks deep emotional response, it is Fivio's formal introduction to the world with a heavy-hitting drill project which will lead the way for future drill projects globally". Kyann-Sian Williams of NME compared B.I.B.L.E. to Kanye West's tenth studio album, Donda (2021), opining that "Fivio Foreign's delivery remains pin-sharp throughout the album, proving that with a few inspired beats, he can produce utter greatness", "with its drill influences and eclecticism, this is perhaps the record 'Donda' could have been, proving that Fivio has plenty of scope to transcend drill culture". Joe Coscarelli of The New York Times wrote that on the album, Fivio "hopes to smooth a path for the city's [New York's] ascendant hip hop scene, even as it draws criticism amid a rise in gun violence" and "tries to maneuver an unconventional sound onto a more conventional path: smoothing down drill's street edge into something safely marketable". David Crone from Allmusic stated that "The majority of B.I.B.L.E. roots itself in cross-over appeal, offering up radio-primed drill anchored in familiar samples and big-hit collaborators, but instead of looking to fight for drill's new boundaries, Fivio makes a quick, and disappointing, grab for stardom. It's hard to fault him for getting the bag, but as long as Fivio keeps his ambitions on the brand, he will step further from excellence. This is a disappointing backpedal from America's drill ambassador."

Commercial performance
B.I.B.L.E. debuted at number nine on the US Billboard 200 chart, earning 29,000 album-equivalent units (including 1,000 copies in pure album sales) in its first week, according to MRC Data. This became Fivio's first US top-ten debut on the chart. The album also accumulated a total of 37.75 million on-demand official streams of the album’s songs.

Track listing

Notes
 "City of Gods" features additional vocals from Playboi Carti.

Sample credits
 "City of Gods" contains samples from "New York City", written by Andrew Taggart and Britney Amaradio, and performed by the Chainsmokers.
 "What's My Name" contains samples from "Say My Name", written by Beyoncé Knowles-Carter, Kelendria Rowland, LeToya Luckett, LaTavia Roberson, LaShawn Daniels, Rodney Jerkins, and Fred Jerkins III, and performed by Destiny's Child.
 "World Watching" contains samples from "Lights", written by Ellie Goulding, Richard Stannard, and Ash Howes, and performed by Ellie Goulding.
 "Love Songs" contains samples from "So Sick", written by Shaffer Smith, Mikkel Eriksen, and Tor Erik Hermansen, and performed by Ne-Yo.
 "Can't Be Us" interpolates "Slippin'", written by Earl Simmons, and performed by DMX.
 "Paris to Tokyo" contains sample vocals from "Rocketeer", written by Kevin Nishimura, James Roh, Virman Coquia, Jae Choung, Jonathan Yip, Ray Romulus, Jeremy Reeves, Peter Hernandez, Philip Lawrence, and performed by Far East Movement featuring Ryan Tedder.

Personnel

 Mike Dean – mastering, mixing
 German Valdez – mixing, engineering (track 5)
 Todd Bergman – engineering (1)
 Bordeaux – engineering (2, 3)
 Non Native – engineering (2, 4–8, 10, 13–17)
 John Cunningham – engineering (4)
 Earl Washington – engineering (5)
 Simone Torres – engineering (7)
 Gentuar Memishi – engineering (9)
 Barrington Hall – engineering (11)
 Joe Grasso – engineering (12)
 Juan Peña – engineering (12)
 Sean Solymar – engineering assistance
 Tommy Rush – engineering assistance
 Loren Fleisher – engineering assistance (1)
 Carlos Mora – engineering assistance (16)

Charts

References

2022 debut albums
Fivio Foreign albums
Columbia Records albums
Albums produced by DVLP
Albums produced by Mike Dean (record producer)
Albums produced by Kanye West
Albums produced by Dem Jointz